The men's 3000 metres steeplechase event at the 2022 African Championships in Athletics was held on 10 August in Port Louis, Mauritius.

Results

References

2022 African Championships in Athletics
Steeplechase at the African Championships in Athletics